The Lytham Trophy is an amateur golf tournament founded in 1965 by the Royal Lytham & St Annes Golf Club, where it has always been held. It is a 72-hole scratch stroke play competition, and is classified as a Category A event by the World Amateur Golf Rankings.

In 2004 James Heath set a new tournament record with an 18 under par total of 266, winning by eight strokes over Ross Fisher. His total was five strokes better than the 271 posted by Tom Lehman when he won The Open Championship in 1996, and is believed to be a record four round total over the course.

Winners

References

External links
Royal Lytham & St Annes Golf Club – official site

Amateur golf tournaments in the United Kingdom
Golf tournaments in England
Sport in the Borough of Fylde
Lytham St Annes
1965 establishments in England
Recurring sporting events established in 1965